Turl Street is a historic street in central Oxford, England.

Location 
The street is located in the city centre, linking Broad Street at the north and High Street at the south. It intersects with Brasenose Lane to the east, and Market Street and Ship Street to the west. These streets link Turl Street to the busy Cornmarket, and to the iconic Radcliffe Square.

It is colloquially known as The Turl and is home to three of the University of Oxford's historic colleges: Exeter, Jesus and Lincoln. It meets the High Street by the early 18th century All Saints church, which has been Lincoln College's library since the 1970s.

History
Turl Street was called St Mildred's Street in 1363, but was known as Turl Gate Street by the mid-17th century. It acquired this name from a twirling gate (demolished in 1722) which was in a postern in the city wall. The part to the south of Ship Street was known as Lincoln College Lane in 1751.

Originally the Turl came to an abrupt halt at its junction with Ship Street, where it reached the city wall and the twirling gate. By 1551, it was extended by a path (known as "The path leading from the Hole in the Wall") to reach what is now Broad Street, and in 1722 the gate was removed altogether.

The Turl has been closed to traffic (except for access) since 1985. A rising bollard, installed by the Oxford City Council, cuts it off in the middle.

Commerce
As well as the three Turl Street colleges, the street houses several shops, including a sports shop, a bar and restaurant (the Turl Street Kitchen), a costume shop, an Oxfam bookshop, two jewellery shops, a café, a stationery shop (Scriptum Fine Stationery), a leather goods shop, a whisky shop, a wine shop (located on the site of the traditional shoe shop Ducker & Son) and the traditional gentleman's tailors, Walters of Oxford. The site now occupied by the Turl Street Kitchen was once the QI Building ("QI Oxford") (associated with the Quite Interesting television series).

The Turl Street colleges also have student housing above and around many of these shops.

Miscellaneous
Turl Street is the subject of an obscure ecclesiastical joke, based on its location. "How is the Church of England like Turl Street? It runs from the High to the Broad and it has Jesus."

Turl Street is also the site of another famous (probably apocryphal) story. An American tourist is said to have entered Lincoln College and asked the porter: "Say buddy, is this Jesus?"
To which the porter replied: "Typical Yank; thinks Lincoln was Jesus."

Turl Street Wanderers FC is a football club playing in the London Football League Sunday PM Premier Division. For the first four years of its existence the club played in the West End (London) Amateur Football Association. The club was founded in 2004 by alumni of Lincoln College and Jesus College.

The Turl Street Arts Festival is organised annually by students from the three colleges in the street: Exeter, Jesus and Lincoln.

Gallery

References

Streets in Oxford
Shopping streets in Oxford
History of Oxford
Jesus College, Oxford
Lincoln College, Oxford
Exeter College, Oxford